Elections were held in the organized municipalities in the Algoma District of Ontario on October 24, 2022, in conjunction with municipal elections across the province.

The following are the results of the mayoral races in each municipality and the council races in the City of Sault Ste. Marie.

Blind River

Mayor
One-term incumbent Sally Hagman has been re-elected as mayor of Blind River by acclamation.

Bruce Mines

Mayor
The results mayor of Bruce Mines were as follows.

Dubreuilville
Beverley Nantel was acclaimed as mayor of Dubreuilville.

Mayor

Elliot Lake
The following were the results for mayor of Elliot Lake.

Mayor
Incumbent mayor Dan Marchisella was challenged by city councillor Chris Patrie, accessibility advocate Mike Thomas, and Geraldine Robinson.

In January 2023, just a few weeks after taking office, Patrie was removed from office in a ruling that he had violated municipal conflict of interest rules by lobbying, in his prior term as a city councillor, to have the city's new recreation centre built near the Oakland Plaza, in which he is a part owner, instead of on the former Algo Centre Mall site. The city has not yet officially announced how it will fill the vacancy; deputy mayor Andrew Wannan is currently serving as acting mayor, while Patrie has appealed the ruling.

Hilton

Reeve
Rodney Wood was re-elected as reeve by acclamation.

Hilton Beach
Incumbent mayor Robert Hope has been acclaimed as mayor of Hilton Beach.

Mayor

Hornepayne
Cheryl Fort was re-elected as mayor of Hornepayne by acclamation.

Mayor

Huron Shores
The following were the results for mayor of Huron Shores.

Mayor

Jocelyn
The following were the results for reeve of Jocelyn.

Reeve

Johnson
Township councillor Reg McKinnon was acclaimed as mayor of Johnson.

Mayor

Laird
The following are the results for mayor of Laird.

Mayor

Macdonald, Meredith and Aberdeen Additional

Mayor

North Shore, The
Tony Moor was re-elected as mayor of The North Shore by acclamation.

Mayor

Plummer Additional
The following were the results for mayor of Plummer Additional.

Mayor

Prince
The following were the results for mayor of Prince.

Mayor

Sault Ste. Marie
The following are the results for mayor and city council of Sault Ste. Marie.

Mayor
Incumbent mayor Christian Provenzano did not run for re-election. Running to replace him were city councillors Matthew Shoemaker and Donna Hilsinger, former councillor Ozzie Grandinetti, climate activist Tobin Kern and public relations consultant Robert Peace.

Sault Ste. Marie City Council

Two elected per ward.

Spanish
The following were the results for mayor of Spanish.

Mayor

St. Joseph
The following were the results for mayor of St. Joseph.

Mayor

Tarbutt
Lennox Smith was re-elected as mayor of Tarbutt by acclamation.

Mayor

Thessalon
Bill Rosenburg was re-elected as mayor of Thessalon by acclamation.

Mayor

Wawa

Mayor
Incumbent mayor Ron Eady did not run for re-election. Deputy mayor Melanie Pilon was elected as mayor by acclamation.

White River

Mayor

References

Algoma
Algoma District